Clonlara School  is private alternative school located in Ann Arbor, Michigan, United States.

History
Clonlara was founded by Pat Montgomery in 1967 as a private day school.

Home schooling program
The school offers a correspondence program for home schooled students. As of 2013, about 5000 students are enrolled in the correspondence program, but only 50 attend classes on the campus.

See also 

 Alternative school

References

External links
Clonlara School

Education in Ann Arbor, Michigan
Schools in Washtenaw County, Michigan
Alternative schools in the United States
Homeschooling in the United States
Private high schools in Michigan
Private middle schools in Michigan
Private elementary schools in Michigan
1967 establishments in Michigan
Educational institutions established in 1967